In Irish mythology, Abhean, son of Bec-Felmas, was a poet of the Tuatha Dé Danann, and in particular of Lugh. He was killed by Óengus in front of Midir, according to a poem by Fland Mainistreach in Lebor Gabála Érenn.

Etymology
The reconstructed Proto-Celtic lexica at the universities of Leiden and Wales suggest that this name may be derived from Proto-Celtic  *Ad-bej-ānos, literally meaning 'at-striking-related-one' and possibly denoting the concept of 'harp-strumming'.

References

Bibliography

External links
 Celtic Gods and their Associates

Arts gods
Irish gods
Tuatha Dé Danann
Lugh